Somaliland Beverage Industries abbreviated as SBI is a beverage corporation headquartered in Hargeisa, capital of Somaliland. Founded in 2010 by Ahmed Osman Guelleh, a local businessman. Based on the revenue, SBI is the largest beverage business in Somaliland.

History
In early 2010, SBI was awarded a license to build & operate a Coca-Cola bottling factory in Somaliland. SBI is the country's single biggest investment to date. The opening of the $17 million Coca-Cola production plant took place on 22 May 2012 and was presided over by then-president Ahmed Mohamed Mohamoud.

See also

 List of companies of Somaliland
 Economy of Somaliland

References

External links
Official Website of SBI

2010 establishments in Somaliland